The 2016–17 season was Manchester City Football Club's 115th season of competitive football, 88th season in the top flight of English football and 20th season in the Premier League. Along with the league, the club also competed in the UEFA Champions League (for the sixth year in a row), FA Cup and League Cup. The season covered the period from 1 July 2016 to 30 June 2017.

Club "brand update"
In conjunction with the recruitment of Pep Guardiola, the manager whom City's executives had sought to hire since they joined the club four years previously and the man synonymous with the style of football they wanted the club to espouse, Manchester City announced a series of adjustments to the club's "brand" prior to the start of the season.

On 15 October 2015, the club announced that they intended to enter into a consultation with their fans over the designing of a new badge to replace the design that had been brought in 1997 and which had largely been unpopular since. The result of the online-based consultation was a design bearing many of the hallmarks of the crest replaced in 1997, plus some elements of the style established by the other club badges of fellow City Football Group teams Melbourne City FC and New York City FC. While many praised the logo for its simplicity and similarity to the beloved previous design, it was criticised from other corners for its slightly amateurish appearance, its removal of the words "Football Club" and for its failure to more closely replicate the earlier badge.

On 30 June 2016, the club unexpectedly announced the renaming of their Twitter accounts and website. Replacing the old "branding" of MCFC (the initials of the club), both social media outlets were rechristened "ManCity". While the move was popular among many, especially the club's more recent foreign fans for whom the styling was already their preferred abbreviation of the club's name, the change provoked another mixed reaction from the Manchester-based core supporter base, with many criticising the decision to use a wording often used by the club's rivals, as well as highlighting the decision to again remove the "Football Club" wording.

Friendlies

Pre-season
On 20 July 2016, Manchester City began their pre-season with a 0–1 defeat against Bayern Munich. Due to bad weather during the International Champions Cup, the derby against Manchester United was cancelled, and City went on to play Borussia Dortmund in their next cup match, which they would go on to win 6–5 on penalties after drawing 1–1 at the end of regular time. A match was played on 7 August against Arsenal in the 2016 Supermatchen, which ended 3–2 to Arsenal. To replace the game against Manchester United, which was cancelled, City arranged a friendly against St Johnstone, which was played behind closed doors.

Friendly

2016 International Champions Cup

2016 Super Match

Competitions

Overall

Premier League

League table

Results summary

Results by matchday

Matches
38 matches were played, two against each other team in the league; one at home and one away.

FA Cup

As a Premier League club, Manchester City entered the competition in the third round, drawing West Ham United away from home.

League Cup

As a European club, Manchester City entered the competition in the third round, drawing Swansea City away from home.

UEFA Champions League

In the first season under the reign of Pep Guardiola, hopes were high for Manchester City as they progressed to the knock-out phase after finishing second in the group that featured Guardiola's former team, Barcelona. City lost their away match to Barça 0–4, but then rebounded to win 3–1 at home. In the round of 16 City were drawn with Monaco and were expected to progress to the quarterfinals. The Blues were trailing 1–2 and 2–3 in their home match before scoring three unanswered goals and winning 5–3. In the away game, the Cityzens were down 0–2 when Leroy Sané scored and seemingly brought the ticket to the quarterfinals to Man City, but Tiémoué Bakayoko's late goal meant that Monaco progressed further and City were eliminated.

Play-off round

The draw for the Champions League play-off round took place on 5 August 2016. Manchester City were a seeded team in the league route. They were drawn against Steaua București of Romania.

Group stage

The group stage draw was made on 25 August 2016 in Monaco. Manchester City were drawn with Barcelona (pot 1), Borussia Mönchengladbach (pot 3), and Celtic (pot 4).

Round of 16

Squad information

First team squad 

 |Academy Graduate
 |Academy Graduate
 |Academy Graduate
 |Academy Graduate
 |Academy Graduate
 |Academy Graduate
 
Ordered by squad number.
Appearances include league and cup appearances, including as substitute.

Playing statistics

Appearances (Apps.) numbers are for appearances in competitive games only including sub appearances
Red card numbers denote:   Numbers in parentheses represent red cards overturned for wrongful dismissal.

Goalscorers

Awards

Premier League Player of the Month award
Awarded monthly to the player who was chosen by a panel assembled by the Premier League's sponsor

Premier League Manager of the Month award
Awarded monthly to the manager who was chosen by a panel assembled by the Premier League's sponsor

Etihad Player of the Month awards 
Awarded to the player that receives the most votes in a poll conducted each month on the club's official website

Etihad Player of the Season 

In association with the Official Manchester City Supporters Club

 David Silva

Transfers

Transfers in

Total spending:  £171,500,000

Transfers out

Total earnings:  £28,000,000

Loans out

References

Manchester City F.C. seasons
Manchester City
Manchester City